Turner Tenney (born January 2, 1998), better known as Tfue, is an American streamer and esports player, best known for playing Fortnite.

Career 
Tenney previously streamed games such as Call of Duty, Destiny and H1Z1, but he transitioned to Fortnite Battle Royale as it was quickly gaining popularity. Tfue later joined FaZe Clan, a professional esports organization.

In May 2018, Tenney was banned from Twitch for 30 days, after allegedly using a racial slur on one of his streams. Twitch reversed the ban after reviewing the word wasn't used in a racial manner.

On July 2, 2018, Tenney received a permanent account ban on his Epic Games accounts because he was allegedly selling and buying Epic Games accounts, which is prohibited by Epic Games' terms and conditions. A week later, Tenney was banned from Twitch again, this time for 14 days, for unknown reasons.

On May 20, 2019, Tenney filed a lawsuit against the FaZe Clan, claiming that they "pressured Tenney to live in one of their homes in Los Angeles, pressured him into underage drinking and illegal gambling. FaZe also continuously pressured and encouraged him to engage in dangerous stunts." Tenney also claimed, that "he only got 20% from any branded videos that are published on Twitch, YouTube or social media and half of his revenue from touring and appearances." FaZe Clan responded on Twitter, saying that they didn't take any money from his tournament winnings, Twitch and YouTube revenue or his social media. They also said that they "took $60,000 from his branded videos" and offered Tenney "an improved contract multiple times, with 100% of the money going to Tenney, but he rejected or ignored all of them."

On August 1, 2019, FaZe Clan filed a federal lawsuit in New York, suing Tenney, claiming that he violated his contract by disparaging the company and trying to form a rival esports organization. The organization also claims that Tenney allegedly directly leaked confidential information about his contract to media publications, violating their terms.

On September 2, 2019, Tenney again appeared to allegedly use a racial slur while streaming. However, Twitch did not take action this time.

Tfue claimed he "wouldn't care" if he and his stream fell off. Speaking on the Raw Talk podcast, Tfue explained that he has already achieved a lot and invested in real estate, so he wouldn't be too concerned if he fell off. While still enjoying streaming, he said he doesn't feel worried about losing it all, unlike other influencers who feel that way. Tfue's success on Twitch and beyond puts his achievements into perspective.

Personal life 
Tenney is from Indian Rocks Beach, Florida. He went to middle school for a week, but thought that "[...] it sucked [there] [...]" which is why "[...] [he] never really went to school [...]" after that and was homeschooled.

In 2019, he moved to New Jersey with his duo partner Cloakzy.

See also 
 List of most-followed Twitch channels

References

Living people
1998 births
American esports players
FaZe Clan players
Fortnite
People from Pinellas County, Florida
Twitch (service) streamers